Chiller is a five-part British horror fantasy anthology television series, produced by Yorkshire Television, that first broadcast on ITV on 9 March 1995. Described by The Guardian as ITV's "answer to The X Files", the series was inspired by, but unconnected to, the 1991 Channel 4 thriller Gray Clay Dolls, which broadcast under the Chiller banner, the series featured writing contributions from renowned playwrights Stephen Gallagher, Glenn Chandler and Anthony Horowitz.

Each story involves, to some extent, a supernatural element; and also a number of leading British actors, including the likes of Nigel Havers, Martin Clunes, John Simm, Peter Egan and Kevin McNally. Lawrence Gordon Clark, a former showrunner for the BBC's A Ghost Story for Christmas strand, acts as executive producer, alongside David Reynolds and Peter Lover. The series' opening episode, Prophecy, was adapted from a story by novelist Peter James. The complete series of Chiller was released on Region 2 DVD via Network Distributing on 1 July 2013. Shout! Factory, copyright holders of the series, uploaded all five episodes to YouTube on 31 October 2018 as part of their Halloween celebrations.

Reception
George Bass, writing for The Guardian wrote; "Chiller is worth it for Toby alone, but the other four stories will spook you out too. Martin Clunes appears an overworked and sceptical professional; such characters recur, particularly in opener The Prophecy. We watch as death catches up with a circle of college friends, only one of whom (a young Sophie Ward) was smart enough to see that there may be trouble ahead after a ouija board delivers the verdict death/death/death."

He continued; "It’s a tale that bears astonishing similarities to the Final Destination film franchise. Then there are the blinkered sceptics standing firm against overwhelming evidence, and contrived deaths galore. Chiller is reminder of a time when networks weren’t afraid of giving horror writers free rein. It also features John Simm as a seriously ill young man, delivering the line: “If it wasn’t for the murders, and all the psychiatric problems, and me breaking into your house and bringing you here, and everything, do you think you could’ve taken to me at all?”

In a review of Prophecy, critic David Howe praised the serial as "...the tale of eerie coincidence and death rattled along at a tremendous pace, leaving the viewer breathless. At the end of it, I found myself wondering whether I had just watched a 90 minute film, rather than a 50 minute drama, such was the amount of characterisation and plot that Gallagher managed to cram in." However, Howe criticised the relationship between the widowed aristocrat Oliver Halkin (Nigel Havers) and Fransesca "Fanny" Monsanto (Sophie Ward), under the grounds that Ward was young enough to be Havers' daughter and argued that it was implausible that the young people who attended the seance did not visibly age over the course of the five years afterwards.

Episodes

References

External links
 

1995 British television series debuts
1995 British television series endings
1990s British crime television series
1990s British drama television series
1990s British anthology television series
ITV television dramas
British supernatural television shows
English-language television shows
Serial drama television series
1990s British television miniseries
Television series by ITV Studios
Television series by Yorkshire Television
1990s British horror television series
British fantasy television series